William McKenney House, also known as the McKenney-Dunlop-Totty House is a historic home located at Petersburg, Virginia. It was built in 1890, and is a large -story, Queen Anne / Eastlake style townhouse.  It features stained and leaded glass, elaborate pressed brickwork, terra cotta roof trim, and a circular corner tower with a conical roof.

It was listed on the National Register of Historic Places in 1990, and currently serves as a public library. It is located in the Poplar Lawn Historic District.

References

Houses on the National Register of Historic Places in Virginia
Queen Anne architecture in Virginia
Houses completed in 1890
Houses in Petersburg, Virginia
National Register of Historic Places in Petersburg, Virginia